Alina Tumilovich (Łacinka: Alina Arturaŭna Tumilovič; born 21 April 1990) is a Belarusian rhythmic gymnast. She is a two-time Olympic medalist in the group all-around competition.

Career 

Tumilovich has competed in two Olympic Games. She won a bronze medal in the group all-around competition at the 2008 Summer Olympics in Beijing. At the 2009 World Championships, she won silver medals in group all-around and 3 ribbons & 2 ropes, and bronze in 5 hoops. They repeated as the group all-around silver medalists at the 2010 World Championships.

At the 2012 European Championships, Tumilovich was a member of the group that won the all-around silver medal and gold in 3 ribbons/2 hoops. At the 2012 Summer Olympics in London, she won silver in the group all-around event together with group members Maryna Hancharova, Ksenia Sankovich, Nataliya Leshchyk, Aliaksandra Narkevich, and Anastasia Ivankova.

Detailed Olympic results

References

External links
 
 
 

1990 births
Living people
Belarusian rhythmic gymnasts
Gymnasts at the 2008 Summer Olympics
Gymnasts at the 2012 Summer Olympics
Olympic gymnasts of Belarus
Olympic bronze medalists for Belarus
Olympic medalists in gymnastics
Medalists at the 2012 Summer Olympics
Medalists at the 2008 Summer Olympics
Gymnasts from Minsk
Medalists at the Rhythmic Gymnastics World Championships
Medalists at the Rhythmic Gymnastics European Championships
Olympic silver medalists for Belarus
21st-century Belarusian women